Parrenthorn High School is a comprehensive school located in Prestwich in the English county of Greater Manchester. There is some discrepancy as to whether the school is located within Prestwich or Simister, the neighbouring village, local Prestwichians would always refer to Parrenthorn being in Simister but the actual border comes 10 meters further up Heywood Road than the school. The school was rated "Requires Improvement" in all categories in its 2019 Ofsted inspection. The head teacher is Mr C. Bell, replacing Mr M. Fitzgerald who retired in 2016 after 12 years in post.

The School
Parrenthorn is a coeducational community school with technology college status and is administered by Bury Metropolitan Borough Council. Established in 1974, the school underwent a major rebuild and refurbishment in 2009. An additional building extension was completed in 2013 and another one was completed in 2018.

School uniform comprises a black blazer with school crest, white shirt with black or grey trousers or skirt and black shoes.

Curriculum
Parrenthorn High School offers GCSEs and OCR Nationals. Core subjects in Key Stage 3 are English Language and Literature, maths, science, RE and PE, with most pupils also studying a modern foreign language and either history or geography.  Optional subjects include drama, DT, computer science and music.

Sport
Set amid extensive playing fields, the school has a sports hall and gymnasium, as well as netball and basketball courts and an Astroturf pitch. Sports (both within the PE syllabus and as extracurricular activities) include athletics, badminton, basketball, cricket, cross country, hockey, netball, rounders, soccer and trampolining.

References

External links
Parrenthorn High School official website

Secondary schools in the Metropolitan Borough of Bury
Educational institutions established in 1974
1974 establishments in England
Community schools in the Metropolitan Borough of Bury